The Last Witness is a 1921 German silent film directed by Adolf Gärtner and starring Albert Bassermann, Elsa Bassermann and Olga Engl. It was shot in 1919, but not released until April 1921.

The film's sets were designed by the art director Hans Dreier.

Cast
 Albert Bassermann
 Elsa Bassermann
 Irmgard Bern
 Olga Engl
 Friedrich Wilhelm Kaiser
 Meinhart Maur
 Fritz Moleska
 Frida Richard

References

Bibliography
 Alfred Krautz. International directory of cinematographers, set- and costume designers in film, Volume 4. Saur, 1984.

External links

1921 films
Films of the Weimar Republic
German silent feature films
Films directed by Adolf Gärtner
German black-and-white films
1920s German films